Yelena Vasilyevna Vasilevskaya, (born 27 February 1978 in Sverdlovsk) is a Russian volleyball player. She was a member of the national team that won the silver medal in the Sydney 2000 Olympic Games.

External links
Uralochka VC profile
sports-reference.com

1978 births
Living people
Sportspeople from Yekaterinburg
Russian women's volleyball players
Olympic volleyball players of Russia
Volleyball players at the 2000 Summer Olympics
Olympic silver medalists for Russia
Olympic medalists in volleyball
Medalists at the 2000 Summer Olympics
20th-century Russian women
21st-century Russian women